The 3rd Panzer Army was a German armoured formation during World War II, formed from the 3rd Panzer Group on 1 January 1942.

3rd Panzer Group 
The 3rd Panzer Group was formed on 16 November 1940.  It was a constituent part of Army Group Centre and participated in Operation Barbarossa and fought in the Battle of Moscow in late 1941 and early 1942.  Later it served in Operation Typhoon, where it was placed under operational control of the Ninth Army.  Panzergruppe 3 was retitled the 3rd Panzer Army on 1 January 1942.

Orders of battle 
At the start of Operation Barbarossa the Group consisted of the XXXIX and LVII Army Corps (mot.).

2 October 1941 
Part of Army Group Centre.
 Commander:  Colonel General Hermann Hoth
 Chief of Staff:  Colonel Walther von Hünersdorff
 XLI Motorized Corps under General of Panzer Troops Georg-Hans Reinhardt
 1.Panzer-Division under Lieutenant General Friedrich Kirchner
 36.Infanterie-Division (Mot.) under Lieutenant General Otto-Ernst Ottenbacher
 LVI Motorized Corps under General of Panzer Troops Ferdinand Schaal
 6.Panzer-Division under Major General Franz Landgraf
 7.Panzer-Division under Major General Hans Freiherr von Funck
 14.Infanterie-Division (Mot.) under Major General Friedrich Fürst
 VI Corps under General of Engineers Otto-Wilhelm Förster
 6.Infanterie-Division under Lieutenant General Helge Auleb
 26.Infanterie-Division under Major General Walter Weiß
 110.Infanterie-Division under Lieutenant General Ernst Seifert

3rd Panzer Army was formed by redesignating 3rd Panzer Group on 1 January 1942.

In March 1944, the 3rd Panzer Army took part in the forced assembly and deportation of Russian civilians in the Borisov area. The civilians were deported to Germany for use as forced labor.

During Operation Bagration in July 1944, 3rd Panzer Army became part of the encirclement at Tekino, the Duna and Vitebsk, where it was largely destroyed. Surviving units retreated through Lithuania before reforming a line near Courland, fighting and being defeated during the Battle of Memel in late 1944.

In February 1945 the 3rd Panzer Army was one of the armies that made up the new Army Group Vistula. On 10 March 1945, General Hasso-Eccard von Manteuffel was made the commander of the 3rd Panzer Army, which was assigned to defend the banks of the Oder River, north of the Seelow Heights, thus hampering Soviet access to Western Pomerania and Berlin. They then faced an overwhelming Soviet attack launched by General Rokossovsky's 2nd Belorussian Front during the Battle of Berlin. On 25 April the Soviets broke through 3rd Panzer Army's line around the bridgehead south of Stettin and crossed the Randow Swamp.

Following the defeat at Stettin, 3rd Panzer Army was forced to retreat into the region of Mecklenburg – the headquarters of 3rd Panzer Army. Manteuffel made negotiations with British generals including Field Marshall Bernard Montgomery at Hagenow on 3 May 1945 so that he with 300,000 German soldiers would surrender to the British rather than Soviet forces.

Commanders

Notes

References 
 Wilhelm Tieke, Das Ende zwischen Oder und Elbe, Stuttgart: Motorbuch Verlag, 1995
 D. F. Ustinow et al. Geschichte des Zweiten Welt Krieges 1939–1945, Berlin: Militärverlag der DDR, 1982

External links 
 12th Army Group situation maps

P3
Military units and formations established in 1940
Military units and formations disestablished in 1945